Ivanteyevsky District is an administrative and municipal district (raion), one of the thirty-eight in Saratov Oblast, Russia. It is located in the northeast of the oblast. Its administrative center is the rural locality (a selo) of Ivanteyevka. Population: 15,186 (2010 Census);  The population of Ivanteyevka accounts for 40.2% of the district's total population.

References

Notes

Sources

Districts of Saratov Oblast